The List of National Hockey League (NHL) players with 1,000 points is a list of the individual players who have scored at least 1,000 regular season points during their career in the NHL. A point in the NHL is awarded to a player for scoring a goal or to the player(s) that assists a player to score the goal; a maximum of two assists can be awarded per goal.

As of the  season — the 104th regular season of play of the NHL — 95 different ice hockey players have scored at least 1,000 regular season points in their NHL career.

A 1,000-point career was first achieved in the 44th year of the NHL, when Gordie Howe scored his 1,000th point in his 938th game. The first (of only eight) defenceman to reach 1,000 points was Denis Potvin, playing in his 987th game during the 70th year of the NHL.

The most recent player to reach 1,000 points was Steven Stamkos, on December 1, 2022.

Season achievements
The 1997–98 NHL season saw the largest number of players (six) achieve their 1,000th point. A total of five players scored their 1,000th point in the  season.

Of these 16, there were six seasons between Gordie Howe and the second player, Jean Beliveau, to make it to the 1,000-point mark.

Player achievements
The fewest NHL games required to reach the mark was 424, set by Wayne Gretzky. Second quickest was Mario Lemieux, achieving the mark in his 513th game. In a sense, Gretzky was the fastest and the second fastest, as he scored his second 1,000 points (the NHL's only player ever to score 2,000 points in regular-season play) only 433 games after scoring his first 1,000 points. Of the eight defenseman to score 1,000 points, the fewest NHL games required was 770, set by Paul Coffey.

The slowest player to achieve 1,000 points was Patrick Marleau with 1,349 games followed by Nicklas Lidstrom with 1,336.

Of the 95 players to score at least 1,000 points in their career, 56 reached the mark in fewer than 1,000 career games played.

Dave Andreychuk came closest to the statistical coincidence of scoring 1,000 points in exactly 1,000 games, scoring his 1,000th point in the 998th game he played.

Of those on the list, Brian Propp came closest to 'not' achieving 1,000 points — reaching the mark with only eight games remaining in his final NHL season. Lanny McDonald scored his 1,000th point with only ten games remaining in his final season.

Thirteen players could have made the list on assists alone. Wayne Gretzky, Ron Francis, Mark Messier, Ray Bourque, Paul Coffey, Adam Oates, Steve Yzerman, Jaromir Jagr, Gordie Howe, Marcel Dionne, Mario Lemieux, Joe Sakic and Joe Thornton have had at least 1,000 regular season assists in their NHL careers.

Team achievements
A total of 24 different NHL franchises have had a player score their 1,000th point while playing for the franchise. Including three franchises that have changed cities, there have been 27 different teams that have celebrated a player's 1,000th point.

Seven players scored their 1,000th point while playing for the Detroit Red Wings and Pittsburgh Penguins, and six have done so with the New York Rangers, Toronto Maple Leafs, Chicago Blackhawks and the Boston Bruins.

Only three times have multiple players reached 1,000 points on the same team in the same season. The Washington Capitals had three teammates score their career 1,000th point during the  season—Adam Oates, Phil Housley and Dale Hunter. The Toronto Maple Leafs had two teammates, Doug Gilmour and Larry Murphy, achieve the mark during the  season. The Ottawa Senators had two teammates, Daniel Alfredsson and Alexei Kovalev, reach the mark during the  season.

1,000-point scorers

Legend
Team – Team for which the player scored 1,000th point
HHOF – Year of membership into the Hockey Hall of Fame  (Note: after retirement there is a three year minimum waiting period)
Game No. – Number of career games played when 1,000th point was scored
Date – Date of 1,000th point
GP – Career games played
G – Career goals
A – Career assists
Pts – Career points
(D) – Defenceman

(Table updated as of March 17, 2023)

 † This was Gretzky's 857th game overall, but only his 433rd game after achieving his first 1,000 points.

Active players within 100 points

The following players are within 100 points of reaching 1,000 career points, as of March 17, 2023.

Retired players within 100 points
These are players who are now retired that came within 100 points of reaching 1,000 for their career. They are listed with the NHL team for which they played the most games.

References

2005 NHL Official Guide & Record Book 

National Hockey League statistical records
Lists of National Hockey League players